Some Like It Hot is a current musical based on the MGM/UA film Some Like It Hot, with music by Marc Shaiman, lyrics by Scott Wittman & Shaiman, and a book by Matthew López & Amber Ruffin. The musical, like the film, follows the story of jazz age musicians struggling during Prohibition.

Production history

Broadway (2022) 
The musical was originally scheduled to have its out-of-town engagement in Chicago at the Cadillac Palace Theatre, but was later announced that the engagement was canceled following the COVID-19 shutdown.

The show began previews at the Shubert Theatre on Broadway on November 1, 2022, with an opening night on December 11, directed by Casey Nicholaw and features Christian Borle as Joe/Josephine, Kevin Del Aguila as Osgood, J. Harrison Ghee as Jerry/Daphne, and Adrianna Hicks as Sugar.

Cast and characters

Musical numbers

Act I
"What Are You Thirsty For?" - Sue & Ensemble
"You Can't Have Me (If You Don't Have Him)" - Joe & Jerry
"Vamp!" - Joe & Jerry
"I'm California Bound" - Sue, Joe, Jerry, Sugar & Ensemble
"A Darker Shade of Blue" - Sugar
"Take It Up A Step" - Sugar, Josephine, Daphne, & Ensemble
"Zee Bap" - Sue, Daphne, & Ensemble
"At the Old Majestic Nickel Matinee" - Sugar
"Poor Little Millionaire" - Osgood & Ensemble
"Some Like It Hot" - Sue, Sugar, Daphne & Ensemble

Act II
"Let's Be Bad" - Osgood, Daphne, & Ensemble
"Let's Dance the World Away" - Joe, Sugar, Ensemble
"Fly, Mariposa, Fly" - Osgood & Ensemble
"You Could've Knocked Me Over With a Feather" - Daphne
"He Lied When He Said Hello" - Joe & Ensemble
"Ride Out the Storm" - Sugar
"Tip Tap Trouble" - Company
"Baby, Let's Get Good" - Company

See also
Sugar (musical) - a 1972 Broadway musical also based on the movie.

External links 

 Official website

References

2022 musicals
Broadway musicals
Musicals based on films
Musicals by Marc Shaiman
Musicals by Scott Wittman